The D'Bari are a fictional alien race appearing in American comic books published by Marvel Comics. They are famous as the people whose star system was destroyed by Phoenix during the Dark Phoenix Saga (1980).

The D'Bari appeared in the 2019 film Dark Phoenix with their leader Vuk portrayed by Jessica Chastain.

Publication history
The D'Bari first appeared in Avengers #4 (March 1964), the same issue in which Captain America was formally introduced to the Marvel Universe, and were created by Stan Lee and Jack Kirby. The race suffered an Extinction Event in The Uncanny X-Men #135 (July 1980).

Since that time, the D'Bari have been shown in flashback in Classic X-Men #43 (January 1990), and later writers have asserted that a small number of D'Bari, not on their homeworld at the time of its destruction, survived, including stories in She-Hulk #43-46 (September–December 1992), Nova (vol. 2) #1 (November 1994) and #15 (March 1995), Wolverine (vol. 2) #136-138 (March–May 1999), Wolverine (vol. 2) Annual 2000, and The Uncanny X-Men #387 (December 2000).

Fictional race biography
The D'Bari were a humanoid plant species that lived on the fourth planet of the D'Bari system, located within the sphere of influence of the Shi'ar Empire. One D'Bari originally appeared using a device that turned the Avengers into stone. His name was later revealed to be Vuk, and he did this at the behest of Namor who had a vendetta against the Avengers at the time and promised to free the D'Bari's spaceship (which had become trapped under the sea), if he incapacitated the Avengers. The newly revived Captain America promised to free the alien's ship in return for restoring the Avengers. This done, he helped them defeat the Sub-Mariner and his army, and freed the D'Bari's spaceship. After repairing the ship, Vuk left the planet.

The D'Bari are perhaps most well known for the last moment of their existence, as the Dark Phoenix replenished itself by destroying their sun. Approximately five billion D'Bari died when their star went nova.

After killing herself on the moon, Phoenix found herself with Death, who made her relive the life of a D'Bari woman named Gvyn just before the planet was destroyed. As Gvyn, Phoenix found herself walking with two other D'Bari women who were trying to fix her up with a boy Gvyn had met at school, and she protested that she didn't need a matchmaker. A moment later, they all see the sun go nova, surrounded by the Phoenix effect.

Not all D'Bari were on their homeworld at the time of its destruction, and one survivor was Vuk because he had not reached D'Bari IV when the Phoenix consumed their sun. Instead he encountered a group of Xartans on the way, and they invited him into their midst on Dandesh IV, in the outer regions of the Coal Sack nebula. However, news about the destruction of his planet reached him. The Xartans eventually adopted Vuk's form, pretending to be a D'Bari outpost, hoping to elude the wrath of the Skrulls, who sought vengeance on them for infringing on their "franchise" (the ability to shape-shift). Meanwhile, Rocket Raccoon had landed on the outpost, and after he saw one of the false "D'Bari" relax his form for a second, Vuk and the Xartans knew they had to stop him.

Following a distress signal to the outpost, Razorback and Taryn O'Connell arrive just in time to see Rocket Raccoon get petrified. Razorback and Taryn tried to rescue Rocket but they were captured. She-Hulk allowed herself to be captured by the "D'Bari", and as intended, she was brought to the same cell as Razorback and Taryn. As She-Hulk and Razorback compared notes, Razorback was about to reveal that the "D'Bari" were imposters, but the real D'Bari turned him to stone before he could get words out. Vuk intended to intimidate She-Hulk and Taryn into explaining why they were there, but She-Hulk tried to use an Ovoid mind-transfer technique to contact her ally Weezi Mason aboard an orbiting Skrull ship. This, however, backfired, swapping instead the build and powers of the two women. Eventually, the Skrulls recognized the Xartans' ruse and beamed down to the outpost, where Weezi freed She-Hulk and her allies. Unwilling to see his replacement family destroyed again, Vuk overloaded his petrifactor which turned the whole planet and everything within 100,000 miles to stone for 100 hours; however, She-Hulk and her allies were able to escape the petrifaction effect, only returning after it had subsided to recover Razorback and Rocket Raccoon, who were restored by the petrifaction wave as they were already petrified. The Skrulls, the Xartans and Vuk were all petrified.

Another D'Bari to escape the destruction of the D'Bari planet was Tas'wzta, who become a Centurion in the Nova Corps. However, he was one of the Nova Corps members to be slaughtered by the Luphomoid Kraa.

After being cured of the petrifaction, Vuk found the Collector's "Prisonworld" which served as a hideout, cloaked from Galactus. Noticing Vuk's presence and due to his species' destruction, the Collector took him to "Prisonworld" to add to his collection. As time passed, Vuk sought companionship and eventually budded off a "son" whom he named Bzztl. Vuk recognized Wolverine, who had just arrived on "Prisonworld", as one of the X-Men, and in his rage over Phoenix destroying their planet, attacked him, but Wolverine easily threw him to the side and explained that he was there to help them break out. The cell where Vuk and Bzztl were residing was eventually inspected by some of the Collector's agents while searching for Wolverine. The planet was eventually found and consumed by Galactus due to the interference of Wolverine, and while Bzztl was among the escapees, Vuk went missing during Galactus' consumption of "Prisonworld".

During the events of "Maximum Security", Vuk, now wearing a suit of armor and calling himself Starhammer, arrived on Earth and joined a few expatriate Imperial Guardsmen and Borderers in ambushing the X-Men. Vuk personally assaulted Jean Grey to avenge the D'Bari population. He recognized that she was different from the one that destroyed his planet, though he blamed her nonetheless as she had summoned the Phoenix Force and her personality had shaped its form as Phoenix. In desperation, Jean was able to telepathically convince Vuk he had actually slain her, at which point he went into an inert state after being overwhelmed by his apparent success.

It was later revealed that the few D'Bari survivors had since settled down on a new planet with Starhammer as their hero. However, his heroic status is eventually torn down when Jean's tampering eventually faded away and the truth is revealed. Exiled and shunned by his own family, a disgraced Starhammer could only think of one thing...revenge. So he travels to Earth, but strangely enough, he fiercely believes that the humiliation he suffered was caused by Rachel Grey, who was used to be a psychic, living host for the Phoenix Force. He arrives at the moment where Rachel (who didn't known him), Kitty Pryde and Nightcrawler were with Captain Britain and Meggan, to celebrate the birth of their baby daughter, Maggie, a healthy 3-month-old baby, whose mental faculties have developed so fast that she is capable of fluent speech and intelligent enough to carry a philosophical debate about the illusion of choice. Maggie is the one who actually manages to stop Starhammer's ambush without resorting to violent means and leads to a solution that helps Starhammer abandon his quest for revenge. She reveals at least one dimension where the D'Bari didn't suffer an extinction event and to where Starhammer and his society can travel and have a chance to rebuild their lost civilization.

Known D'Bari
 Bzztl – A D'Bari and the "son" of Vuk.
 Gvyn A female D'Bari. She was killed when the Phoenix Force consumed D'Bari IV.
 Starhammer/Vuk – A D'Bari who once fought the Avengers and later developed a personal vendetta against Jean Grey for what happened to the D'Bari's planet. He later takes on the name of Starhammer after obtaining a suit of armor.
 Tas'wtza – A D'Bari that joined the Nova Corps. Killed by Kraa.

In other media

Television
The D'Bari are featured in the Avengers Assemble episode "Guardians and Space Knights." To prevent Galactus from consuming Earth, Iron Man takes Galactus to another location. The planet that Iron Man (who was empowered by the Power Cosmic) led Galactus to turns out to be the D'Bari's planet which Galactus starts consuming. While the D'Bari evacuate the planet as part of the "Galactus Contingency Plan," the Avengers and the Guardians of the Galaxy work to prevent Galactus from consuming the planet. It later turns out that the D'Bari's planet was becoming unstable before Galactus' arrival and its explosion knocked out Galactus. Star-Lord mentioned that the D'Bari settled on another planet.

Film
The D'Bari appear as the main antagonists in the 2019 film Dark Phoenix. The featured D'Bari are Vuk (under the alias "Margaret Smith" and portrayed by Jessica Chastain) and "Jones" (portrayed by Ato Essandoh). In this version, the D'Bari are a race of shape-shifting aliens whose planet was destroyed by the cosmic entity known as the Phoenix Force. Vuk is the leader of the D'Bari and attempts to manipulate Jean Grey, who is possessed by the Phoenix Force following an X-Men mission to rescue the crew of the space shuttle Endeavour. Vuk and her followers assume human forms and infiltrate Earth, intending to take it over. She tracks down and befriends Jean, intending to drain the Phoenix Force from her. However, she is stopped by Professor X and Cyclops. After the X-Men and Magneto's followers are captured by the U.S. government, Vuk and her D'Bari forces attack the train transporting the mutants, with the soldiers mistaking the aliens for mutants. During the battle where most of the D'Bari are either dead or incarcerated by the X-Men, Magneto and the surviving government soldiers, Vuk makes a second attempt to drain Jean of the Phoenix Force. Jean unleashes her full powers and Vuk is consumed by the Phoenix Force then Jean herself becomes pure energy and disappears in a brilliant release of energy.

References

External links
 D'Bari at Marvel Wiki
 
 

Characters created by Jack Kirby
Characters created by Stan Lee
Plant characters